The Rip Curl Pro 2015 was an event of the Association of Surfing Professionals for 2015 ASP World Tour.

This event was held from 1 to 12 April at Bells Beach, (Victoria, Australia) and contested by 18 surfers.

The tournament was won by Carissa Moore (HAW), who beat Stephanie Gilmore (AUS) in final.

Round 1

Round 2

Round 3

Round 4

Quarter finals

Semi finals

Final

References

Surfing competitions in Australia
2015 World Surf League
2015 in Australian sport
2015 in Australian women's sport
Sports competitions in Victoria (Australia)
Women's surfing